A  Wine Olympics was organized by the French food and wine magazine Gault-Millau in 1979. A total of 330 wines  from 33 countries were evaluated by 62 experts from ten nationalities.  The 1976 contestant Trefethen Vineyards Chardonnay from  Napa Valley won the Chardonnay tasting and was judged best in the world. Gran Coronas Mas La Plana 1970 from Spain received first place in the Cabernet Sauvignon blend category. In the Pinot noir competition, the 1975 Eyrie Vineyards Reserve from Oregon placed in the top ten. The 1975 HMR Pinot Noir from Paso Robles placed third. Tyrell Pinot Noir 1976 from Australia was selected for the Gault-Millau World Dozen and placed first.

See also
 Wine competition
 Blind tasting of wine
 1976 Judgment of Paris

References

Further reading
 Taber, George M. Judgment of Paris: California vs. France and the Historic 1976 Paris Tasting that Revolutionized Wine. NY: Scribner, 2005

Wine tasting
Wine-related events